Our Lady of the Thirty-Three, also known as the Liberator of Uruguay, is a title of the Virgin Mary and the Patroness of Uruguay.

History
This image dates from the 18th century and is of Guarani origin. It was venerated by the Thirty-Three Orientals in 1825. In 1857, one of them, General Manuel Oribe, presented a golden crown as a gift to the Virgin.

On 8 September 1930, Pope Pius XI formally declared Our Lady of Lujan as the Patroness of Uruguay. The Papal document was signed by Cardinal Eugenio Pacelli, the future Pope Pius XII.

In 1962, the image was solemnly crowned by bishop . Soon afterwards, Pope John XXIII declared her patron saint of Uruguay.

The image was consecrated by Pope John Paul II in his visit to Uruguay in 1988.

Devotion
The Cathedral of Florida is the shrine where this image is venerated. Ever since the country's independence, there have been pilgrimages to it, for instance, in times of pests. The first National Pilgrimage was in 1908. A very important pilgrimage was carried out by bishop Miguel Paternain in 1945, covering almost one half of the whole country.

A yearly pilgrimage is held every second Sunday of November.

Places of worship
The Virgin of the Thirty-Three has many churches dedicated to her:
 Cathedral Sanctuary of Our Lady of the Thirty-Three in Florida
 Parish Church of Our Lady of the Thirty-Three in Maldonado
 Parish Church of Our Lady of the Thirty-Three in Treinta y Tres
 Parish Church of Our Lady of the Thirty-Three in Montevideo
 Montevideo Metropolitan Cathedral has an important image of the Virgin of the Thirty-Three
And there are also several chapels devoted to Her in all the country.

References

External links

Catholic Church in Uruguay
Titles of Mary
National symbols of Uruguay
Thirty-Three Orientals
Religion in Florida Department